This article lists the presidents of the Assembly of Madrid, the regional legislature of the Community of Madrid.

Presidents

References
 

Madrid
Presidents of the Assembly of Madrid